The 1964 Fresno State Bulldogs football team represented Fresno State College—now known as California State University, Fresno—as a member of the California Collegiate Athletic Association (CCAA) during the 1964 NCAA College Division football season. Led by first-year head coach Phil Krueger, Fresno State compiled an overall record of 4–6 with a mark of 1–3 in conference play, tying for fourth place in the CCAA. The Bulldogs played home games at Ratcliffe Stadium on the campus of Fresno City College in Fresno, California.

Schedule

Team players in the NFL
The following were selected in the 1965 NFL Draft.

References

Fresno State
Fresno State Bulldogs football seasons
Fresno State Bulldogs football